Alicia Rubio (Madrid, September 15, 1986) is a Spanish film, theater and television actress.

Biography 
She trained at the prestigious school of dramatic art directed by Juan Carlos Corazza, school also of actors such as Javier Bardem, Elena Anaya or Pilar López de Ayala.  She also trained with various teachers of the stature of Julio Chávez and Claudio Tolcachir. She had her first opportunities on the small screen participating in series such as Mesa para cinco, Alquilados and Cuestión de sexo.

In cinema, she made her first incursions in the films 8 citas, by Peris Romano and Rodrigo Sorogoyen; and After, by Alberto Rodríguez Librero. n 2012 she participated as a supporting actress in Daniel Sánchez Arévalo's film Primos; where she played Toña, a nurse and girlfriend of José Miguel's character (Adrián Lastra).

In 2013, she joined the eighth season of the daily afternoon series Amar es para siempre, aired daily on Antena 3. Rubio played the role of Macarena, a young law student at a time when it was not common for women to study. Also that year she had a small role in Daniel Sánchez Arévalo's film La gran familia espYearla. For this performance she won the award for best supporting actress at the Actors Union Awards.

In 2014, after leaving Amar es para siempre, Rubio participated in eight episodes of the Cuatro series Ciega a citas, where she played Alegría.

In 2015 she returned to television with the series Algo que celebrar, of  Antena 3, which only had one season due to its low audience figures. She also participated in the first season of the series Mar de plástico with an episodic character. In addition, we saw her in the film by Directed by María Ripoll Ahora o Nunca, starring María Valverde and Dani Rovira.

In 2016 she appeared in the film Tarde para la ira, directed by her partner of ten years, actor Raúl Arévalo.

In addition, we have seen Rubio in numerous theatrical productions throughout her career. She has participated in the play Los miércoles no existen dirigida by Maite Peréz Astorga and Peris Romano. She has also appeared in the play Dentro y Fuera, written and directed by Víctor García León; Cuatro estaciones y un día, co-starring Sergio Mur at the Teatro Lara and directed by Miguel Ángel Cárcano; Muere, Numancia, muere, written by Carlos Be and directed by Sonia Sebastián; Pequeña Pieza Psicopática, directed by Hernán Gristenin; Los trapos sucios dirigida por Ana López-Segovia; and Juventudes dirigida by Natxo López.

She has also appeared in several short films, including Sinceridad, directed by Paco Caballero, in which she starred alongside Raúl Arévalo and for which she won the award for best actress at the prestigious Cortogenia festival in 2010. She has also participated in Cristales and De noche y de pronto, a short film that was nominated for the Goya awards in 2014.

Filmography

Cinema

Television

Awards and nominations 

 Cortogenia

 Spanish Actors Union

Personal life 
For ten years she was romantically involved with actor and director Raúl Arévalo, with whom she has coincided on more than one occasion on the big screen..

References

External links 
 Alicia Rubio on IMDb

21st-century Spanish actresses
Actresses from Madrid
Living people
1986 births
Spanish film actresses
Spanish television actresses